Lim Eun-kyung (born July 7, 1984) is a South Korean actress. Lim first rose to fame as the "TTL Girl" in a series of SK Telecom commercials, then pursued a professional acting career. She starred in the films Resurrection of the Little Match Girl, Conduct Zero, Doll Master, and Marrying High School Girl.

Early life
Lim Eun-kyung was born as an only child to deaf parents. She became fluent in Korean Sign Language. Her family's story was later published in 2006.

Career

Modeling
Lim made her entertainment debut as a model for SK Telecom in 1999 when she was still in high school. TTL was a mobile phone service targeting the younger generation, especially those in their twenties. After appearing in a series of TTL ads, Lim's mysterious yet innocent looks attracted attention and popularity, and she became known as the "TTL Girl."

Acting
She made her acting debut in Jang Sun-woo's big-budget sci-fi blockbuster Resurrection of the Little Match Girl in 2002. But the film received mixed reviews, and became a box-office flop. Lim's performance was panned, with critics and audiences saying her unimpressive acting was merely a replay of her image in the TTL commercials.

Later in the year, she rebounded with her most commercially successful film, the 1980s-set teen comedy Conduct Zero. Lim received good reviews for transforming into a nerdy high school girl who becomes Ryoo Seung-bum's love interest. This performance earned her a Best New Actress nomination at the 2003 Korean Film Awards.

Lim then appeared in the popular television comedy series Bodyguard in 2003. She returned to the big screen in 2004, with leading roles in the horror films Doll Master and To Catch a Virgin Ghost, and the romantic comedy Marrying High School Girl. All three films did not do well at the box office.

After hosting the variety show !Exclamation Mark and starring in the short-lived sitcom Rainbow Romance, Lim stopped acting in 2006.

Filmography

Film

Television

References

South Korean film actresses
South Korean television actresses
South Korean female models
Living people
1983 births
Pungcheon Im clan